Royal Brunei may refer to:

 Royal Brunei Airlines and its subsidiaries and associated facilities:
 Royal Brunei Catering
 Royal Brunei Engineering
 Royal Brunei Airlines Golf Club
 Royal Brunei Recreation Club
 Royal Brunei Trading
 Royal Brunei Armed Forces and its individual branches:
 Royal Brunei Land Forces
 Royal Brunei Navy
 Royal Brunei Air Force
 Royal Brunei Support Service
 Royal Brunei Training Institute
 Royal Brunei Executive - the arm of the Brunei Government that operates and maintains the executive fleet for the Brunei royal family
 Royal Brunei Police
 Royal Brunei Yacht Club